"Block Rockin' Beats" is a song by British big beat duo the Chemical Brothers. Released in March 1997 as the second single and opening track from their second studio album, Dig Your Own Hole (1997), it topped the UK Singles Chart and peaked at number 40 on the US Billboard Modern Rock Tracks chart. It received a Grammy Award for Best Rock Instrumental Performance.

Two different edits of "Block Rockin' Beats" exist: the version found on Dig Your Own Hole has an intro, while the version released as a single begins with the bass line. The B-side "Morning Lemon" is also available on the second disc of the limited edition Singles 93–03.

Blender listed the song on number 346 on its ranking of "Greatest Songs Since You Were Born" in 2005. LA Weekly put it at number 14 in their list of "The 20 Best Dance Music Tracks in History" in 2015.

Samples
The drums are sampled from "Changes" by Bernard Purdie. The vocals, "Back with another one of those block rockin' beats" is a sample from American rapper Schoolly D's 1989 song "Gucci Again".

Another reviewer wrote that the track uses (without compensation) the bass line from the track "Coup" by 23 Skidoo. The opening bass riff resembles the intro from the Pink Floyd song "Let There Be More Light", while the bass sound has been sampled from The Crusaders' song "The Well's Gone Dry".

"Morning Lemon" opens with a vocal sample of a man singing "Morning lemon", and ends with a sample of Ice Cube saying "Take that, motherfuckers!" (from his song "What They Hittin' Foe?").

Chart performance
"Block Rockin' Beats" was a major hit on the charts in Europe, Australia, New Zealand, Canada and the US. In Europe, the song peaked at number one in its first week on the UK Singles Chart on March 30, 1997. It spent one week at the top position before dropping to number eight the following week. The single also hit number two on the UK Dance Singles Chart. It entered the top 10 also in Finland (6), Iceland (2), Ireland (9) and Scotland (4). Additionally, it was a top 20 hit in Norway (13) and Sweden (12), as well as on the Eurochart Hot 100, where it peaked at number 12 in April 1997. In Australia and New Zealand, "Block Rockin' Beats" charted at number 28 and 29, respectively. In the US, the song charted on three different Billboard charts; number 5 on the Bubbling Under Hot 100 Singles chart, number 11 on the Dance Singles Sales chart and number 40 on the Alternative Airplay chart. In Canada, it reached number nine and six on the RPM Dance/Urban chart and Rock/Alternative chart.

"Block Rockin' Beats" received a silver record in the UK, after 200,000 singles were sold.

Critical reception
Stephen Thomas Erlewine from AllMusic noted the "slamming cacophony" of the song, "where hip-hop meets hardcore techno, complete with a Schoolly D sample and an elastic bass riff." He added, "Everything is going on at once in "Block Rockin' Beats", and it sets the pace for the rest of the record, where songs and styles blur into a continuous kaleidoscope of sound." Jack Needham from BBC commented, "Not only was the song an undeniable ear worm, but it took the art of sampling to a new level - borrowing its drums from Bernard Purdie and its vocals from US rapper Schoolly D. There have even been suggestions that the track covertly samples Pink Floyd too." Larry Flick from Billboard described it as a "genre-spanning revelation", and stated that "after one spin, you'll be chanting the hook for hours, and the blend of scratchy funk beats and acidic keyboards are sure to get the body moving." A writer for Complex felt that "there was something about the combined fury of that Schoolly D vocal sample, that hypnotic bassline and those big drums that turned this one into an anthem for the breakbeat set." 

The Daily Vault's Sean McCarthy commented, "Beginning with a funky bass beat, the music explodes with a blast of sonic fury. The music itself is fit for dance halls, but what's striking about the leadoff track is the confidence that Simmons and Rowlands display". David Browne from Entertainment Weekly noted the "burning-down-the-disco break beats". Irish Evening Herald said tracks like this are based on infectious melodies "that stick in your head for ages." Sally Stratton from Music & Media noted its "frenetic pace". British magazine Music Week gave it four out of five, adding that "this chunky techno/hip hop sound clash finds the Chemicals at their most in-your-face". Gerald Martinez from New Sunday Times viewed it as "thunderous". A reviewer from People Magazine said that on the "cacophonous, turbo-charged" track, the duo "borrow heavily from hip hop’s cut-and-paste production methods". David Fricke from Rolling Stone felt "Block Rockin' Beats" is the "Whole Lotta Love" of Dance Floor '97. Terri Sutton from Salon described it as "incorrigible", with its "frantic faux guitar interplay, funky bass and underwater detonations." Sunday Mirror commented, "The dance kings follow up the Noel Gallagher flavoured No 1 "Setting Sun" with an even noisier mess of thumping drums and wailing guitars. No celebrity vocals this time but who needs them."

Track listings

Credits and personnel
Credits are lifted from the Dig Your Own Hole album booklet.

Studios
 Recorded at Orinoco Studios (South London, England)
 Mastered at The Exchange (London, England)

Personnel
 The Chemical Brothers – production
 Tom Rowlands – writing
 Ed Simons – writing
 Schoolly D – writing (as Jesse Weaver)
 Steve Dub – engineering
 Mike Marsh – mastering

Charts

Weekly charts

Year-end charts

Certifications

Release history

References

1997 singles
1997 songs
Astralwerks singles
The Chemical Brothers songs
Grammy Award for Best Rock Instrumental Performance
Songs written by Ed Simons
Songs written by Tom Rowlands
UK Singles Chart number-one singles
Virgin Records singles